Denmark competed at the 1906 Intercalated Games in Athens, Greece. 49 athletes, all men, competed in 24 events in 8 sports.

Medallists

Athletics

Track

Field

Cycling

Fencing

Football

Smyrna were a team from the Ottoman Empire, although none of the players were from Turkey and actually included some English players, the final against Greek side Athens was abandoned at half-time with the Danish team leading 9-0, the Greeks refused to come out for the second half.
Squad

 Aage Andersen 
 Vigo Andersen
 Charles Buchwald
 Parmo Ferslev
 Holger Frederiksen 
 Hjalmar Herup
 August Lindgren
 Oscar Nielsen
 Carl Pedersen
 Peder Pedersen
 Henry Rambusch
 Stefan Rasmussen 

Semifinals

Final

Final rank

Gymnastics

In the team all-round event, teams could consist of between 8 and 20 gymnasts, Denmark won the silver medal behind Norway.

Team

Carl Andersen
Halvor Birch
Harald Bukdahl
Kaj Gnudtzmann
Knud Holm
Erik Klem
Harald Klem
Louis Larsen
Jens Lorentzen
Robert Madsen
Carl Manicus-Hansen
Oluf Olsson
Hans Pedersen
Oluf Pedersen
Niels Petersen
Viktor Rasmussen
Marius Skram-Jensen
Marius Thuesen

Rowing

Swimming

Wrestling

Greco-Roman

References

Nations at the 1906 Intercalated Games
1906
Intercalated Games